Kroniki (lit. The Chronicles) is a poetry collection by Czesław Miłosz. It was first published in 1989.

References

1989 poetry books
Polish poetry collections
Poetry by Czesław Miłosz